Jose Abad Santos Avenue (JASA), also known as the Olongapo–Gapan Road and the Gapan–San Fernando–Olongapo Road, is a two-to-thirteen-lane  major highway spanning the provinces of Bataan, Nueva Ecija, Pampanga, and Zambales in Central Luzon, Philippines. The highway is designated as National Route 3 (N3) of the Philippine highway network.

Etymology

Jose Abad Santos Avenue is named in honor of José Abad Santos, Chief Justice of the Supreme Court of the Philippines, who was executed by the Japanese invading forces during World War II. Abad Santos was born in San Fernando, Pampanga, through which the road passes. The avenue's former names once varied, suggesting its segments between two adjacent provinces. It was formerly known as Bataan–Pampanga Road, Nueva Ecija–Pampanga Road, and the Dinalupihan–Olongapo (Bataan–Zambales) segment of Angeles–Porac–Olongapo Road, respectively. The entire stretch was formerly called Olongapo–Gapan Road and Gapan–San Fernando–Olongapo Road (GSO Road). The name was changed in line with Republic Act No. 9477 signed by President Gloria Macapagal Arroyo on May 22, 2007. Nowadays, the avenue is commonly referred to by its acronym JASA; however, its old name is still used.

However, the avenue's segment in Olongapo city proper is a part of and locally known as Rizal Avenue, after the Philippine national hero Dr. José Rizal, for being the road that leads to Manila.

History
Jose Abad Santos Avenue traces its roots to the pre-colonial period. The Kapampangan empire expanded their trade throughout Central Luzon, but were forced to create roads adjacent to the Pampanga River. Since Nueva Ecija, Bulacan, and Rizal (including cities now part of Metro Manila) were readily accessible because the road networks to those locations existed, the empire could not access the provinces of Zambales and Bataan. Through the years, they developed land tracks accessible by foot and small wagons pulled by horses.

When the Spanish colonials came in the Philippines, they developed the road built by the old empire. They widened the road, constructed wooden bridges, and connected it to Olongapo, a very vital location which enabled them to easily access Subic Bay, the site of their naval base.

When the Americans came, they paved the Olongapo Gapan Road and constructed concrete bridges. The longest is the one that traverses the Pampanga River. These actions enabled them to connect their Clark Air Base and their Naval Base in Subic Bay. Greater improvements on the road were made in this period.

When World War II started, the Olongapo–Gapan Road was blockaded, halting transportation throughout the entire span of the road. The Japanese bombed the road to stop the Americans and Filipinos from the fortification of different bases in Central Luzon. During this time, the road was part of Highway 7 from Olongapo to Pampanga, Highway 19 from Pampanga to San Isidro, Nueva Ecija, and Highway 10 from San Isidro to Gapan.

After the end of the War, the Philippine Government rehabilitated and repaired the whole road, paving all of the 118-kilometer-long highway. New bridges were constructed, shoulders were improved and some facilities were added.

During the Mount Pinatubo eruption in 1991, some portions of a highway, especially its Bacolor and Magliman, San Fernando section, were buried in lahar and many bridges were destroyed. A year after the disaster, these sections were rehabilitated, which involved building new roads and bridges as well as making their elevation become higher.

Today, Olongapo–Gapan Road, now called Jose Abad Santos Avenue and designated as  National Route 3 of the Philippine highway network, is the most significant toll-free road that connects Nueva Ecija, Pampanga, Bataan, and Zambales.

Route description
The road passes to Gapan, San Isidro, and Cabiao in Nueva Ecija, Santa Ana, Arayat, Mexico, City of San Fernando, Bacolor, Guagua, and Lubao in Pampanga, Hermosa and Dinalupihan in Bataan, and finally to the city of Olongapo in Zambales. 

The highway also serves a major utility corridor, carrying various high voltage overhead power lines through densely populated areas where acquisition and designation of right of way or power line alignment and lands for their associated structures is impractical. Notable power lines using the highway's right of way for most or part of their route are the Hermosa–Duhat–Balintawak transmission line from Hermosa Substation of National Grid Corporation of the Philippines (NGCP) to San Fernando Exit of North Luzon Expressway (NLEx) and Hermosa–Calaguiman line from NGCP Hermosa Substation in Hermosa to Layac Junction in Dinalupihan. The San Fernando segment of the Hermosa–Duhat–Balintawak line itself is undergoing relocation since 2010 to alleviate heavy traffic along the avenue due to the presence of its electric poles standing on the highway itself, and to pave the way for the expansion of some segments of the avenue, particularly at Barangay Dolores.

Gapan to San Fernando

The road starts on Pan-Philippine Highway (N1/AH26) in the city of Gapan in Nueva Ecija. It enters San Isidro where the road turns westward. A few meters is Cabiao where the road continues straightforward, again turning westward then eastward, entering Pampanga, and passes through Pampanga River. It then passes through residential areas and institutions within the municipalities of Arayat, Santa Ana, and Mexico before entering San Fernando. The road turns west at the Santo Domingo Circle in Santa Ana and turns south at its intersection with Arayat–Mexico Road in Mexico poblacion. In  The SM City Pampanga and Robinson Starmills malls can be seen on a boundary between Mexico and City of San Fernando. It intersects with North Luzon Expressway after passing these two malls. It crosses MacArthur Highway through Dolores Flyover, continues on a straight route, with its city proper being visible from the highway, with another flyover named Lazatin Flyover through Lazatin Boulevard. A few meters past the flyover is San Fernando Central Transport Terminal. The city's welcome sign could be located on this portion and after it, the highway enters Bacolor.

Bacolor to Olongapo
 
Upon entering Bacolor, the road turns eastward and passes through the lahar-filled Pasig-Potrero River. It passes through Bacolor town proper, with its parish church being visible from the highway. It continues on a straight direction, intersects with Guagua-Santa Rita Provincial Road and San Antonio-Siran Road, turns westward, and enters Lubao after passing the second road mentioned before. It continues straightforward, passing through residential areas and establishments within the municipality and parallels the Lubao Old National Road. It then enters Bataan through the Pampanga Welcome marker and traverses the municipalities of Hermosa and Dinalupihan, where it turns right at the Layac Junction. It then bypasses the poblacion, turns westward, and crosses below the Subic–Clark–Tarlac Expressway (SCTEX). It then parallels into it, continues on a straight direction, passings through barangays San Benito, Colo, Naparing, Happy Valley, and Roosevelt National Park Protected Area, and the eastern end of Subic Freeport Expressway. It enters Zambales a few meters after the said exit and continues on a zigzag pattern before passing through residential areas within Olongapo. The road then enters the city proper of Olongapo, where it is locally known as Rizal Avenue, and continues towards National Highway (N306) at its terminus at the Ulo ng Apo Rotonda.

Intersections

Landmarks

The Jose Abad Santos Avenue spans for about 118 kilometers, thus, many establishments and landmarks are built alongside the highway. This landmarks are malls, historical sites, government facilities, and many more other establishments. Two major shopping malls along the road are SM City Pampanga, the second largest mall in Northern and Central Luzon, and Robinsons Starmills Pampanga.

References

Roads in Pampanga
Roads in Nueva Ecija
Roads in Bataan
Roads in Zambales